Furness Abbey, or St. Mary of Furness, is a former Catholic monastery located to the north of Barrow-in-Furness, Cumbria, England. The abbey dates back to 1123 and was once the second-wealthiest and most powerful Cistercian monastery in the country, behind Fountains Abbey, prior to its dissolution during the English Reformation. The abbey contains a number of individual Grade I Listed Buildings and is a Scheduled Monument.

History of the abbey

Early history 

Founded in 1123 by Stephen, Count of Boulogne, it was built originally for the Order of Savigny. Located in the 'Vale of Nightshade', south of Dalton-in-Furness, the abbey is built entirely out of local sandstone. It passed in 1147 to the Cistercians, who gradually enlarged and rebuilt the original ornate church. The majority of the current ruins date from the 12th and 13th centuries. By the 15th century, it had been completely remodelled and had become the second richest and most powerful – as well as one of the grandest – Cistercian abbeys in England, behind Fountains Abbey.

The monks of the abbey were large landowners, and the most powerful body in what was then a remote border territory. In particular, they were heavily influential on the Isle of Man. One of the kings of Mann and the Isles is buried at the abbey, as are many of the Bishops of Sodor and Man. Rushen Abbey on the Isle of Man was built on land owned by the monks. They also owned mines on the island, and built Piel Castle to control trade between the Furness Peninsula and the Isle of Man.

Being about 70 miles down the coast from Scotland, the monks occasionally found themselves in between the frequently warring Scots and English. When Robert the Bruce invaded England, during The Great Raid of 1322, the abbot paid to lodge and support him, rather than risk losing the wealth and power of the abbey.

The Abbey was disestablished and destroyed in 1537 during the English Reformation under the orders of Henry VIII.

Recent history 
The abbey now lies in ruins and is on the Cistercian Way – a walk which used to link the abbey with the nearby town of Dalton-in-Furness. William Wordsworth visited several times and referred to it in his 1805 autobiographical poem The Prelude, whilst J. M. W. Turner made numerous etchings of the abbey. Queen Victoria and her lady in waiting Augusta Stanley are known to have visited in 1848 based on the diaries of the latter. Other notable tourists include the Theodore Roosevelt family. It was the first unguided visit on their European tour. A young Teddy Roosevelt and his siblings played on the ruins, which, in 1869, were not roped off or restricted. In 1896, while touring industrial Northern England, Chinese statesman Li Hongzhang visited the abbey site. Viceroy Li stayed longer than expected, so that his schedule had to be rearranged.

Conservation and protection 
The Furness Abbey complex is a Scheduled Monument and Conservation Area containing five Grade I listed buildings and structures. Restoration work took place between 2008 and 2017 amid fears that part of the abbey could have collapsed.

Folklore and supernatural activity 

There are many stories and sightings claiming that Furness Abbey is haunted. There are supposedly at least three ghosts which have been seen numerous times at the Abbey. First, it is said that the spirit of a monk has been seen climbing a staircase and also possibly walking towards the gatehouse before vanishing into a wall. Another sighting is that of a squire's daughter. She was known to meet her lover at the ruined abbey after the Reformation, although one day her partner took a journey out to sea from which he never returned. It is thought that the girl went back to the Abbey every day until her death to the site she and her partner once loved; the track she walked is today still known as "My Lady's Walk." There have also been many sightings of a white lady, although due to possible conflicting stories, it is unclear whether the White Lady and the ghost of the squire's daughter are the same person or not. Possibly the most famous ghost of Furness Abbey is a headless monk on horseback, who rides underneath the sandstone arch near the Abbey Tavern; the death of this individual is linked to an invasion by the Scots in 1316.

A tunnel is said to run underneath the Abbey to both Piel Castle and Dalton Castle, allowing the monks to receive supplies and keep watch upon the local settlements. It has also been rumoured that the Holy Grail and King John's missing jewels are hidden somewhere inside the 'Ley tunnel'.

Mystery plays 

Furness Abbey has hosted a number of large-scale mystery plays. The first of these were performed over several consecutive nights in 1958. The mystery plays continued throughout the 1960s until the recruitment of  participants, perhaps over 100, became difficult. Author Melvyn Bragg attended the 1988 mystery plays revival, which were the last such performances at the abbey. Prince Edward has also attended a mystery play.

Access and facilities 
Furness Abbey is located off Manor Road close to Barrow's main thoroughfare, Abbey Road, which is named after the Abbey itself. The Abbey also lies next to the Furness Line and was served by Furness Abbey railway station until closure in 1950. The closest stations are now Roose and Dalton.

English Heritage operates a small visitor centre at Furness Abbey which includes a number of stone carvings and effigies as well as a gift shop. It, alongside the abbey is open to the public between 10am and 6pm daily, although this is restricted to 10am to 4pm on weekends within the winter/spring season. Free passes are available for English Heritage members as well as local residents, while standard visitor entry in 2018 is £5.70 per adult. During Winter venturing into the Abbey is strongly discouraged due to the Abbey grounds being prone to flooding.

Burials
William de Mowbray
William Russell, former Bishop of Mann and the Isles
Rǫgnvaldr Guðrøðarson
Rǫgnvaldr Óláfsson

In literature

Furness Abbey features twice in the Fisher's Drawing Room Scrap Books of the 1830s, both with a poetical illustration by Letitia Elizabeth Landon: in the 1832 edition: Furness Abbey, in the Vale of Nightshade, Lancashire to a drawing by Harwood, in which she 'sighs for the days of the veil and the vow', as an escape from the vanity of the modern world; and, in the 1835 edition: Chapter House, Furness Abbey to a painting by Thomas Allom, a descriptive passage from the French of Charles Augustin Sainte-Beuve.

Gallery

See also

List of monasteries dissolved by Henry VIII of England
Listed buildings in Barrow-in-Furness
Abbot's Wood, Cumbria

Further reading
Atkinson, Rev. J.C., The Coucher Book of Furness Abbey, Printed from the Original Preserved in the Record Office, London, Part 1, London, 1886

References

External links
English Heritage
Information for teachers: English Heritage
Risk assessment information for teachers: English Heritage

1123 establishments in England
1537 disestablishments in England
Christian monasteries established in the 12th century
English Heritage sites in Cumbria
Grade I listed buildings in Cumbria
Grade I listed monasteries
History of Barrow-in-Furness
Monasteries in Cumbria
Cistercian monasteries in England
Religious organizations established in the 1120s
Ruins in Cumbria
Scheduled monuments in Cumbria
Tourist attractions in Cumbria
Tourist attractions in Barrow-in-Furness
Buildings and structures in Barrow-in-Furness
Reportedly haunted locations in North West England
Ruined abbeys and monasteries
Burial sites of the Crovan dynasty
Monasteries dissolved under the English Reformation